Renata Martínez Notni (born January 2, 1995 in Cuernavaca, Morelos, Mexico) is a Mexican actress and model.

Early life
Notni was born in Cuernavaca, Morelos, Mexico. As a child, she attended acting lessons at CEA Infantil, the children's version of drama school, Centro de Educación Artística, run by Televisa in Mexico City.

Acting career
She made her acting debut in the 2006 telenovela, Código Postal, when she was 10 years old. Since then, she has had roles in eight telenovelas including Mar de amor and Amorcito Corazón. She has also participated in the Mexican television series, La rosa de Guadalupe and Como dice el dicho. In 2014, she briefly relocated to New York City and enrolled in an acting course at Stella Adler Acting Studio. In November 2014, she travel to Madrid to film, Yo quisiera, a youth-oriented television series, serving as her first acting role outside of Mexico. She received word that she had been cast as the lead in Televisa's upcoming telenovela, Amor de barrio, shortly after finishing her acting class. Her participation in the telenovela was official confirmed in March 2015. The part was Notni's first starring role. Amor de barrio aired weekdays on Canal de las Estrellas beginning June 4, 2015. The telenovela's finale aired on November 8, 2015.

Following the conclusion of Amor de barrio, Notni was cast in a role in the psychological thriller play, Las que no sienten. The play premiered in November 2015 in at Teatro en Corto in Mexico City on November 5, 2015. It ran until December 15, 2015. On  November 18, 2015, she attended an open casting call for a role in producer Juan Osorio's upcoming telenovela, Sueño de amor. On November 26, 2015, Notni was confirmed for one of the lead youth roles in the telenovela.  Filming began in late December 2015, and the telenovela premiered in Mexico on February 22, 2016. It premiered in the U.S on Univision on March 8, 2016.

In 2017 she was the main role at the series Mi adorable maldición (English: My Sweet Curse). She played part as Aurora a girl showered by misfortunes and everybody used to believe she was cursed.

Personal life
Notni currently resides in Mexico City. She is fluent in English. She is in a relationship with actor Diego Boneta.

Filmography

Theatre

Music videos

Awards and nominations
 Premios TVyNovelas

Kid Choice Awards Mexico

See also
List of people from Morelos, Mexico

References

External links

 Talent Agency Roster and Profile

1995 births
Living people
Mexican child actresses
Mexican telenovela actresses
Mexican television actresses
21st-century Mexican actresses
Actresses from Morelos
Mexican female models
People from Cuernavaca